= Népújság =

Népújság may refer to:

- Népújság (Romania), a Hungarian daily newspaper in Târgu Mureș, Romania
- Népújság (Slovenia), a Hungarian weekly newspaper in Slovenia
- Tolnai Népúság, a Hungarian daily newspaper in Hungary
